Xenorhina anorbis is a species of frog in the family Microhylidae.
It is found in West Papua in Indonesia and Papua New Guinea.
Its natural habitats are subtropical or tropical moist montane forests, swamps, and rural gardens.
It is threatened by habitat loss.

References

Xenorhina
Amphibians of New Guinea
Taxonomy articles created by Polbot
Amphibians described in 1989